Maij is a Dutch surname. Notable people with the surname include:

 Hanja Maij-Weggen (born 1943), Dutch politician, mother of Hester and Marit
 , Dutch politician
 Marit Maij (born 1972), Dutch politician

Dutch-language surnames